Heldenplatz (English: Heroes Square) is a 1988 stage drama by Austrian playwright Thomas Bernhard. The final play written by Bernhard, it premiered on November 4, 1988 and sparked one of the biggest theater scandals in the history of post-war Austria.

History
Heldenplatz was commissioned by Claus Peymann, director of the Viennese Burgtheater, to be performed for the hundredth anniversary of the theater's opening. The year also coincided with the 50th anniversary of the Anschluss when Nazi Germany annexed Austria. Heldenplatz is the square where Adolf Hitler was greeted on March 15, 1938 and he addressed thousands of jubilant Austrians.

Bernhard wrote his play as a tragic reflection on the obsessive politics of nationalism, the denial of the past and the continued anti-Semitism within modern Austria. Although the play was to be published only after the premiere, selected extracts were leaked to the press in the days prior to the first performance. On October 7, 1988 the Austrian tabloid newspaper with the highest circulation Kronen Zeitung published a story about the play titled "Austria, 6.5 million idiots" and quoted text excerpts from the play which are particularly suitable for a scandal. The quotations, taken out of context, caused a public uproar and Bernhard was vilified. Heldenplatz was also understood as a veiled attack on the election of Austria's president Kurt Waldheim who called the play "an insult to the Austrian people." Critics of the play questioned whether the state should subsidize art critical of Austria. Demonstrations were held and Bernhard, in one instance, was physically assaulted.

Bernhard's sudden death by a heart attack only a few months after the premiere only increased media attention on the play's subject.

Summary
It is the day of the funeral of Josef Schuster, a Jewish university professor. Through the three-act play, his wife Hedwig Schuster, their children, Olga, Anna and Luka, his brother, Robert Schuster, Mrs. Zittel, the housekeeper and Herta, the maid, discuss Josef. it is revealed that fifty years after March 15, 1938, Josef could no longer bear the clamor that always resonated in his head. The couple had decided to return to Oxford where they had lived for ten years in exile before returning to Vienna "for the love of music". A few days before their departure, considering that "now everything is worse than fifty years ago" and that "there are now more Nazis in Vienna than in 1938", Joseph Schuster commits suicide by throwing himself out the window from their apartment overlooking Heldenplatz. The play includes a line about "a nation of 6.5 million idiots living in a country that is rotting away, falling apart, run by the political parties in an unholy alliance with the Catholic Church."

Thomas Bernhard, through his characters, criticizes the continued anti-semitism in Austria: where he could not "listen to Beethoven without thinking of Nuremberg" and where "he did not foresee that the Austrians after the war would be much more hateful and anti-Semitic than before the war."

English Publication
Heldenplatz was first translated by Gita Honegger and published in issue 33 of Conjunctions in 1999. A separate translation, by Meredith Oakes and Andrea Tierney was published by Oberon Books in 2010, and premiered on stage in London that same year.

References

1988 plays
Plays by Thomas Bernhard
Works about nationalism
Works about antisemitism